Rajani Palme Dutt (19 June 1896 – 20 December 1974), generally known as R. Palme Dutt, was a leading journalist and theoretician in the Communist Party of Great Britain. His classic book India Today heralded the Marxist approach in Indian historiography.

Early life
Rajani Palme Dutt was born in 1896 on Mill Road in Cambridge, England. His father, Dr. Upendra Dutt, was an Indian surgeon, his mother Anna Palme was Swedish. Anna Palme was a great aunt of the future Prime Minister of Sweden Olof Palme. His sister was the statistician Elna Palme Dutt, who went on to become an official of the International Labour Organization in Geneva. He, along with his older brother Clemens Palme Dutt, was a founding member of the Communist Party of Great Britain.

Dutt was educated at the Perse School, Cambridge and Balliol College, Oxford, where he obtained a first-class degree in Classics, after being suspended for a time because of his activities as a conscientious objector in World War I, during which his writing was deemed subversive propaganda.

Dutt married an Estonian, Salme Murrik, the sister of Finnish writer Hella Wuolijoki, in 1922. His wife had come to Great Britain in 1920 as a representative of the Communist International.

Political career

Dutt joined the Labour Research Department, a left-wing statistical bureau, in 1919. The following year, he joined the newly formed Communist Party of Great Britain (CPGB) and in 1921 founded a monthly magazine called Labour Monthly, a publication that he edited until his death.

In 1922, Dutt was named the editor of the party's weekly newspaper, the Workers' Weekly.

Dutt was on the Executive Committee of the CPGB from 1923 to 1965 and was the party's chief theorist for many years.

Dutt first visited the Soviet Union in 1923, where he attended deliberations of the Executive Committee of the Communist International (ECCI) relating to the British movement. He was elected an alternate to the ECCI Presidium in 1924.

Following an illness in 1925 which forced him to stand down as editor of Workers' Weekly, Dutt spent several years in Belgium and Sweden as a representative of the Comintern. He also played an important role for the Comintern by supervising the Communist Party of India for some years.

Palme Dutt was loyal to the Soviet Union and to Leninist ideals. In 1939, when the CPGB General Secretary Harry Pollitt supported the United Kingdom's entering the  Second World War, Palme Dutt who promoted Stalin's line and forced Pollitt's temporary resignation. As a result, he became the party's General Secretary until Pollitt was reappointed in 1941, after the German invasion of the Soviet Union cause a reversal in the party's attitude on the war.

His book Fascism and Social Revolution presents a scathing criticism and analysis of fascism, with a study of the rise of fascism in Germany, Italy and other countries. He defined fascism as a violent authoritarian, ultranationalist and irrational theory: "Fascism is antithetical to everything of substance within the liberal tradition."

After Stalin's death, Palme Dutt's reaction to Khrushchev's Secret Speech played down its significance, with Dutt arguing that Stalin's "sun" unsurprisingly contained some "spots". A hardliner in the party, he disagreed with its criticisms of the Soviet invasion of Czechoslovakia in 1968 and opposed its increasingly-Eurocommunist line in the 1970s. He retired from his party positions but remained a member until his death in 1974. According to the historian Geoff Andrews, the Communist Party of the Soviet Union was still paying the CPGB around £15,000 a year "for pensions" into the seventies, recipients of which "included Rajani Palme Dutt".

The Labour History Archive and Study Centre at the People's History Museum in Manchester has Palme Dutt's papers in its collection, spanning from 1908 to 1971.

Works 
1920: The Sabotage of Europe
1920: The Two Internationals
1921: Back to Plotinus, Review of Shaw's Back to Methusela: A Metaphysical Pentateuch
1921: Psycho-Analysing the Bolshevik, Review of Kolnai's Psycho-analysis and Sociology
1922: The End of Gandhi
1923: The British Empire
1923: The Issue in Europe
1925: Empire Socialism (pamphlet)
1926: The Meaning of the General Strike (pamphlet)
1926: Trotsky and His English Critics
1928: Indian Awakening
1931: India
1931: Capitalism or Socialism in Britain? (pamphlet)
1933: Democracy and Fascism (pamphlet)
1933: A Note on the Falsification of Engels’ Preface to “Marx’s ‘Class Struggles in France”
1934: Fascism and Social Revolution
1935: The Question of Fascism and Capitalist Decay
1935: British Policy and Nazi Germany
1935: The British-German Alliance in the Open
1935: For a united Communist Party : an appeal to I.L.P'ers and to all revolutionary workers
1936: In Memory of Shapurji Saklatvala
1936: Anti-Imperialist People's Front in India, written with Ben Bradley
1936: Left Nationalism in India
1938: On the Eve of the Indian National Congress, with Harry Pollitt and Ben Bradley
1938: The Philosophy of a Natural Scientist
1938: The Philosophy of a Natural Scientist, a Rejoinder to Levy
1938: Review of Marx & Engels on the U.S. Civil War
1939: Why this War? (pamphlet)
1940: Twentieth Anniversary of the Communist Party of Great Britain
1940: India Today
1947: Declaration on Palestine, at the Empire Communist Parties Conference, London on 26 February to 3 March 1947
1949: Introductory Report on Election Programme
1953: Stalin and the Future
1953: The crisis of Britain and the British Empire (new and revised edition 1957)
1955: India Today and Tomorrow
1963: Problems of Contemporary History
1964: The Internationale
1967: Whither China?

Footnotes

External links

Fascism and Social Revolution: A Study of the Economics and Politics of the Extreme Stages of Capitalism in Decay (1934)
The Internationale (1964)
R. Palme Dutt Archive Marxists Internet Archive
Resistance to the Soul : Gandhi and His Critics

Communist Party of Great Britain members
Leaders of political parties in the United Kingdom
Anti-revisionists
British Comintern people
English conscientious objectors
English people of Indian descent
English people of Swedish descent
Indian people of Scottish descent 
Indian people of Swedish descent
People educated at The Perse School
Alumni of Balliol College, Oxford
1896 births
1974 deaths
Palme family
People from Cambridge
British Hindus
British expatriates in the Soviet Union
English people of Bengali descent